Diana Taylor is a lawyer, business owner, Diana Taylor Legal Consulting, and company director from Geelong, Victoria. She holds several positions on charity and community organisation boards. She also became the first women to be appointed president of the Western Region Football League (WRFL), the first woman to join the VFL tribunal and, in 2019 the first woman to be appointed Vice President of the  Geelong Football Club after serving as a director and chair governance committee.

In 2016 Taylor won the Victorian Telstra Business Woman of the Year (Category - Corporate & Private)

On 1 March 2023, Diana launched her first book The Playbook.

Football administration

Geelong Football Club 
After being a lifetime long Geelong supporter Taylor was appointed to the Geelong Football board in 2010, taking over for Doug Wade.  "As a lifelong Geelong supporter, I am excited about the opportunity to apply my football, commercial and legal skills to the challenge of ensuring that the club continues to achieve both on-field and off-field success."

After her director appointment Taylor was appointed chair of Nine Lives Geelong, an organisation designed to support and create experiences for the women supporters of the Geelong Football Club. Because of her immense work within the AFL community she was nominated for the AFL Women of the Year Award in 2012.

 2019–present: Vice President of Geelong Football Club  
 2010–present: Director of Geelong Football Club
 2013–present: Chair Governance Committee 
 2011–2015: Chair Nine Lives Geelong

AFL 
 2020–present: AFLW Competition Commission
 2013–2014: Community Football Board 
 2012: AFL Women of the Year Finalist 2012
 2008–2014: Chair Fair Game Respect Matters Board 
 2008–2012: Advisory Board 
 2005–2010: VFL Tribunal Member 
 2004: VFL Appeal Board Member

Community 
In 2008 Taylor became the first female president of a Senior Men's Metropolitan Melbourne Football Competition. After being appointed she commented  "The WRFL (Western Region Football League) is a major community sporting organisation which not only provides people with the opportunity to be involved in our great game, but also serves to strengthen community participation and enhance the health and wellbeing of everyone involved. I am grateful for the opportunity to guide the WRFL and its competition over the next 3 years and to represent the WRFL's interests in the western region of Melbourne."
During her time as president Taylor started the 'Light Alcohol' campaign. The 2009 finals were established for the first time as a light alcohol event and the game was conducted without incident. The campaign was a huge success and was later adopted by VicHealth and AFL Victoria.
Taylor has done charitable work with the Alli Murphy Scholarship alongside the late Frank Costa.

 2008–2009: Western Region Football President (7,200 players)  
 2007: (WRFL) Vice-President  
 2005–2009: WRFL Board Member  
 2001–2004: WRFL Tribunal Member  
 2007–2010: WRFL Chair/Founder Women’s Football Foundation

Board appointments 
Since 2007 Taylor has been appointed to and become a valued board member of several organisations outside of the AFL. After obtaining a Graduate Diploma from the Australian Institute of Company Directors, Taylor has since worked with numerous organisations in the Geelong area and the Victorian Government.   
 2018–present: Board Member, Melbourne Convention & Exhibition Trust
 2021–present: Chair, Geelong Authority
 2017–present: Board Member, Geelong Authority
 2016–present: Chair, Anam Cara House Geelong  The Anam Cara House in Geelong provides respite and end of life care for people with life-limiting illness. Anam Cara House Geelong has received a pledge of support from the Australian Federal government in 2016.  It also has a foundation which relies on the generosity of the community in order to help the house operate. The Sovereign Order of St John of Jerusalem has been a key financial supporter of Anam Cara with the Board and Foundation consisting of several Knights and Dames. When Taylor became the chair of the Foundation in 2014 she expressed how honoured she was to be appointed and praised the work of Anam Cara House.
 2021-present: Board Member, Deakin University Law Advisory Board
 2021-present: Trustee Doutta Galla Aged Services

Previous board appointments 
 2019–2022: Chair and Director: GOTAFE
 2015–2016: Board member for Victoria Government WorkHealth. WorkHealth is a Victorian Government program aimed at improving the health of Victorian workers, by raising awareness and preventing chronic diseases. Taylor was added to the advisory group in April 2015 to help identify how WorkHealth can be improved and expanded.
 2014-2016: Chair, Anam Cara House Foundation 
 2009–2016: Board member, Chair - Risk & Clinical Governance Committee: Doutta Galla Aged Services   Doutta Galla is a not-for-profit organisation that provides aged care services. Taylor joined as a board member in 2009, then when Doutta Galla decided to create two new roles in order to focus more on strategy, finance, governance, risk management and reporting, she was appointed Chair of Risk & Clinical Governance committee in 2012.
 2015–2018: Barwon Sports Academy  The academy have the board involved in their strategic planning for the next 5 years, they are allocated to areas of support for the CEO and staff. A board member since 2015, Taylor uses her background in law to cover legal issues, and is a partner sport advisory for the golf athletes.
 2014–2016: Geelong Gallery  Taylor is heavily involved with the Geelong Gallery, a major regional art gallery with over 6,000 works. Starting as a member of the marketing committee in 2012, then later took on the role of Director in 2014.
 2008–2009: NULIS Nominees Pty Ltd Director Aviva Australia Super Trustee
 2007–2009: NULIS Nominees Pty Ltd Company Secretary  
 2008–2010: VicHealth Alcohol Advisory Group

References

Living people
Australian women in business
People from Geelong
Geelong Football Club administrators
Australian corporate directors
Year of birth missing (living people)